Brixton Hill ward is an administrative division of the London Borough of Lambeth, England. It contains most of the road known as Brixton Hill and part of Acre Lane. It contains Brixton Prison, Lambeth Town Hall, Ashby's Mill (known as Brixton Windmill) and the adjacent Windmill live music venue, Electric Brixton (formerly The Fridge) and the Brixton centre of Lambeth College. The population of the Ward at the 2011 Census was 15,842.

Brixton Hill ward is located in the Streatham Parliamentary constituency.

Lambeth Council elections

References

External links
Lambeth Borough Council profile for the ward
Brixton Hill election results on Lambeth website
Brixton Hill Labour Councillors

Wards of the London Borough of Lambeth